Iriner Tahima Jiménez (born February 24, 1988) is a Venezuelan weightlifter. Jimenez represented Venezuela at the 2008 Summer Olympics in Beijing, where she competed for the women's light heavyweight category (69 kg). Jimenez, however, did not finish the event, as she successfully lifted 90 kg in the single-motion snatch, but failed to hoist 120 kg in the two-part, shoulder-to-overhead clean and jerk.

References

External links
NBC 2008 Olympics profile

Venezuelan female weightlifters
1988 births
Living people
Olympic weightlifters of Venezuela
Weightlifters at the 2008 Summer Olympics
South American Games bronze medalists for Venezuela
South American Games medalists in weightlifting
Competitors at the 2010 South American Games
21st-century Venezuelan women